A centered heptagonal number is a centered figurate number that represents a heptagon with a dot in the center and all other dots surrounding the center dot in successive heptagonal layers. The centered heptagonal number for n is given by the formula 

.

The first few centered heptagonal numbers are

1, 8, 22, 43, 71, 106, 148, 197, 253, 316, 386, 463, 547, 638, 736, 841, 953

Properties
 Centered heptagonal numbers alternate parity in the pattern odd-even-even-odd.
 A heptagonal numbers can expressed as a multiple of a triangular number by 7, plus one:

 is the sum of the integers between n+1 and 3n+1 (including) minus the sum of the integers from 0 to n (including).

Centered heptagonal prime 

A centered heptagonal prime is a centered heptagonal number that is prime. The first few centered heptagonal primes are
43, 71, 197, 463, 547, 953, 1471, 1933, 2647, 2843, 3697, ... 

The centered heptagonal twin prime numbers are
43, 71, 197, 463, 1933, 5741, 8233, 9283, 11173, 14561, 34651, ... .

See also
Regular heptagonal number.

Figurate numbers